Stănești is a commune located in Vâlcea County, Oltenia, Romania. It is composed of nine villages: Bărcănești, Cioponești, Cuculești, Gârnicetu, Linia Dealului, Stănești, Suiești, Valea Lungă and Vârleni.

References

Communes in Vâlcea County
Localities in Oltenia